The Roland JD-Xi is a hybrid analog and digital synthesizer that was released in 2015, together with the larger JD-XA. The JD-Xi comprises a 1 voice analog engine and a 128 voice digital engine (Roland's Supernatural engine) with 2 synth tracks and 1 drum track; in total 4 separate tracks, which can be used interactively or independently. The JD-Xi includes a Vocoder engine with a gooseneck microphone built in. A limited edition white version ran for a limited time in 2015.

Notable users 
 Nick Rhodes
 Warren Ellis
 Mike Dean
 Shiloh Shaddix (Life Is Shit)

References 

Roland synthesizers
Analog synthesizers
Digital synthesizers
Polyphonic synthesizers